David John Taylor  (born 1960) is a British critic, novelist and biographer. After attending school in Norwich, he read modern history at St John's College, Oxford, and has received the 2003 Whitbread Biography Award for his biography of George Orwell. His novel Derby Day was longlisted for the 2011 Man Booker Prize. He was previously a member of the Norwich Writers' Circle.

He lives in Norwich and contributes to The Daily Telegraph, The Guardian, The Independent, New Statesman,  The Spectator, Private Eye and Literary Review, among other publications.

Works

Great Eastern Land: from the notebooks of David Castell (1986), novel
A Vain Conceit: British Fiction in the 1980s (1989)
Other People: Portraits From The 90's (1990), with Marcus Berkmann
Real Life (1992), novel
After the War: The Novel and England since 1945 (1993)
English Settlement (1996), novel
After Bathing at Baxter's (1997), short stories
Trespass (1998), novel
Thackeray (1999), biography
The Comedy Man (2002), novel
Pretext 6: Punk of Me (2002), guest editor
Orwell (2003), biography
Kept (2006), novel
On The Corinthian Spirit: The Decline of Amateurism In Sport (2006)
Bright Young People: The Rise and Fall of a Generation 1918–1940 (2007)
Ask Alice (2009), novel
At the Chime of a City Clock (2010), novel
Derby Day (2011), novel
Secondhand Daylight (2012), novel
The Windsor Faction (2013), novel
Wrote for Luck (2015), stories. Galley Beggar Press
The New Book of Snobs (2016)
The Prose Factory: Literary Life in England since 1918 (2016)
Rock and Roll is Life (2018), novel
Lost Girls: Love, War and Literature, 1939–1951 (2019), collective biography

Prizes and honours

1998: Longlisted for Booker Prize for his novel Trespass
2003: Winner of the Whitbread Prize for biography for Orwell: The Life
2011: Longlisted for the 2011 Man Booker Prize, for his novel Derby Day.
2014: The Windsor Faction winner of the Sidewise Award (tied with Bryce Zabel's Surrounded by Enemies: What If Kennedy Survived Dallas?).

References

External links
 Official website 

1960 births
Living people
20th-century biographers
20th-century British novelists
21st-century British novelists
Alumni of St John's College, Oxford
British biographers
British literary critics
British male novelists
Fellows of the Royal Society of Literature
George Orwell
People educated at Norwich School
Private Eye contributors
Sidewise Award winners
Male biographers